Björn Dreyer may refer to:

 Björn Dreyer (footballer born 1977), German footballer
 Björn Dreyer (footballer born 1989), German footballer